Nicola Elizabeth Brasch is a New Zealand chemistry academic. She is currently a full professor at the Auckland University of Technology.

Academic career

After a 1993 PhD titled  '17O-Nuclear magnetic resonance studies of chromium(VI) oxyanions and some cobalt(III) tren complexes'  at the University of Otago, she moved to Kent State University before returning to Auckland University of Technology, rising to full professor.

Selected works 
 Birch, Catherine S., Nicola E. Brasch, Andrew McCaddon, and John HH Williams. "A novel role for vitamin B12: cobalamins are intracellular antioxidants in vitro." Free Radical Biology and Medicine 47, no. 2 (2009): 184–188.
 Hannibal, Luciana, Jihoe Kim, Nicola E. Brasch, Sihe Wang, David S. Rosenblatt, Ruma Banerjee, and Donald W. Jacobsen. "Processing of alkylcobalamins in mammalian cells: A role for the MMACHC (cblC) gene product." Molecular Genetics and Metabolism 97, no. 4 (2009): 260–266.
 Bernardo, Paul H., Nicola Brasch, Christina LL Chai, and Paul Waring. "A novel redox mechanism for the glutathione dependent reversible uptake of a fungal toxin in cells." Journal of Biological Chemistry (2003).
 Suarez-Moreira, Edward, June Yun, Catherine S. Birch, John HH Williams, Andrew McCaddon, and Nicola E. Brasch. "Vitamin B12 and redox homeostasis: cob (II) alamin reacts with superoxide at rates approaching superoxide dismutase (SOD)." Journal of the American Chemical Society 131, no. 42 (2009): 15078–15079.
 Xia, Ling, Andrew G. Cregan, Louise A. Berben, and Nicola E. Brasch. "Studies on the formation of glutathionylcobalamin: any free intracellular aquacobalamin is likely to be rapidly and irreversibly converted to glutathionylcobalamin." Inorganic chemistry 43, no. 21 (2004): 6848–6857.

References

External links
 

Living people
Year of birth missing (living people)
New Zealand women academics
University of Otago alumni
Kent State University faculty
Academic staff of the Auckland University of Technology
New Zealand chemists
New Zealand women chemists
New Zealand women writers